Minuscule 644 (in the Gregory-Aland numbering), α 476 (von Soden), is a Greek minuscule manuscript of the New Testament, on parchment. Palaeographically it has been assigned to the 14th century. The manuscript is very lacunose. Gregory labelled it by 220a and 275p, Scrivener by 229a (for the Catholic epistles) and 270p (for the Pauline epistles).

Description 

The codex contains the text of the Pauline epistles and Catholic epistles, on 94 parchment leaves (size ), with lacunae (Romans, 2 Corinthians 1:1-11:25; James 4:4-5:4; 1 Peter 3:15-Jude). It is written in one column per page, 21 lines per page. According to Scrivener it is very neatly written.

According to Gregory it could be written by the same hand as Minuscule 502.

The order of books: Pauline epistles and Catholic epistles. Epistle to the Hebrews is placed after Epistle to Philemon.

Text 

The Greek text of the codex is a representative of the Byzantine text-type. Kurt Aland placed it in Category V.

History 

The manuscript is dated by the INTF to the 14th century.

The manuscript was bought from Constantine Simonides, the most versatile forger of the nineteenth century, for the British Museum in 1853. It is one of the very few authentic Simonides pieces. The manuscript was added to the list of New Testament manuscripts by Scrivener (229a, 270p) and Gregory (220a, 275p). It was examined and described by Bloomfield. Gregory saw the manuscript in 1883. In 1908 Gregory gave the number 644 to it.

The manuscript is currently housed at the British Library (Add MS 19388) in London.

See also 

 List of New Testament minuscules
 Biblical manuscript
 Textual criticism

References

Further reading 

 

Greek New Testament minuscules
14th-century biblical manuscripts
British Library additional manuscripts